Togo, officially the Togolese Republic, is a country in West Africa bordered by Ghana to the west, Benin to the east and Burkina Faso to the north. It extends south to the Gulf of Guinea, where its capital Lomé is located.

Togo serves as a regional commercial and trade center. The government's decade-long effort, supported by the World Bank and the International Monetary Fund (IMF), to implement economic reform measures, encourage foreign investment, and bring revenues in line with expenditures, has stalled. Political unrest, including private and public sector strikes throughout 1992 and 1993, jeopardized the reform program, shrank the tax base, and disrupted vital economic activity.

Notable firms 
This list includes notable companies with primary headquarters located in the country. The industry and sector follow the Industry Classification Benchmark framework. Organizations which have ceased operations are included and noted as defunct.

See also 
 Economy of Togo
 List of airlines of Togo
 List of banks in Togo

References 

Companies of Togo
Economy of Togo
 
Togo